Alikhani (also Romanized as ‘Alīkhānī) is a village in Khaneh Shur Rural District, in the Central District of Salas-e Babajani County, Kermanshah Province, Iran. At the 2006 census, its population was 162, in 32 families.

References 

Populated places in Salas-e Babajani County